Bossòst is a small Pyrenean village and municipality located in the Aran Valley, province of Lleida, Catalonia, Northern Spain. Situated on the left bank of the river Garona, the village is bordered by Les, Vilamòs, Arres and France (by Bagnères-de-Luchon).

The local football club, UE Bossòst, has the rare distinction of playing its regular matches in a 'foreign' competition (it plays in the French minor leagues).

References

External links 

Official website of Bossòst
 Government data pages 

Municipalities in Val d'Aran